Hollywood Steps Out is a 1941 short Merrie Melodies cartoon by Warner Bros., directed by Tex Avery. The short was released on May 24, 1941.

The cartoon features caricatures of over 40 Hollywood celebrities.

Plot
A bird's-eye view of Los Angeles is shown with searchlights moving to a conga beat. The action takes place in the famed Ciro's nightclub, where the Hollywood stars are having dinner at $50 a plate and "easy terms".

The first stars seen are Claudette Colbert, Don Ameche, and, at a table behind them, Adolphe Menjou and Norma Shearer, followed by Cary Grant, seated alone. Grant's first lines reference his films My Favorite Wife, The Awful Truth, and His Girl Friday (originally titled The Front Page). Greta Garbo comes along as a cigarette girl, and lights a match for Grant on her notoriously large feet.

In the next scene, Edward G. Robinson asks Ann Sheridan "How's the Oomph girl tonight?" Sheridan, then known as the "Oomph Girl", responds by uttering the word "Oomph" several times.

The camera then tracks past several other tables: Warner Bros. staffers Henry Binder and Leon Schlesinger appear as an in-joke, while the soundtrack quotes "Merrily We Roll Along" – the theme to the Merrie Melodies series. A seat is reserved for Bette Davis, as is a large sofa for the rotund Kate Smith; we see the seats reserved for the characters of the Blondie films, including a fire hydrant for Daisy the dog.

Meanwhile, in the cloakroom, Johnny Weissmuller checks a coat with Paulette Goddard that reveals his Tarzan outfit with the single addition of a tuxedo collar and black bow tie. Sally Rand (famous for her striptease acts and fan dance) leaves her trademark feather "fans" behind and is presumably naked.

In the next scene, James Cagney prepares Humphrey Bogart and George Raft – all known for their gangster roles – for a risky task. They get ready, turn, and start childishly pitching pennies.

Harpo Marx gives Garbo a hotfoot (lights matches tucked under her shoe), but in keeping with her subdued acting style, she responds with only a laconic "Ouch." Clark Gable (known for chasing women) turns his head around 180 degrees to observe a pretty blonde girl whom he follows offscreen.

Emcee Bing Crosby introduces the evening's entertainment, interrupted frequently by a lazy, over-affectionate race horse with an apparently unconscious jockey (The fact that Crosby owned several race horses who never won races was a staple radio gag in the early 1940s). Crosby presents Leopold Stokowski, who wears a snood as he prepares for what promises to be a serious orchestral performance— however, the song is "Ahí, viene la conga" and he dances to the beat. Different things happen during this performance:

 The conga inspires Dorothy Lamour to invite James Stewart to dance with her. Stewart, known for playing "shy guy" roles, stutters, stammers, and finally runs away scared leaving behind a sign reading "Mr. Smith Goes to Washington."
 Gable dances by, following the girl he saw earlier as he quotes "It's me again!"
 Tyrone Power dances with noted ice skater Sonja Henie.
 Boris Karloff (as the Frankenstein's monster) dances stiffly and woodenly.
 The Three Stooges poke, slap and smash each other in rhythm to the beat.
 Oliver Hardy's dance partner is revealed to be twin blonde women initially hidden by his obese frame.
 Cesar Romero dances with Rita Hayworth; considered to be two of the era's best big-screen dancers, they dance clumsily and spastically and Hayworth's gown is tattered at the bottom from being continuously stepped on.
 Mickey Rooney, sitting with Judy Garland, is presented with an expensive bill. A typical scene in the Andy Hardy film series occurs as Rooney turns to ask his on-screen father Judge Hardy (Lewis Stone) for a heart to heart talk. In the next scene, they are seen washing dishes to the conga beat.
 Still following the girl, Gable gives an aside to the audience "Don't go away folks, this oughta be good!"

Crosby then introduces the "feature attraction of the evening:" Sally Rand (identified as "Sally Strand") performing the bubble dance to "I'm Forever Blowing Bubbles". Crosby points to a stage area off screen, where the camera shifts to an unlit area and Rand standing still and holding a large white bubble in front of her presumably nude body from a longshot. A light comes on and shines on her and the camera zooms in on her, where we see Rand blink twice before motioning herself to dance. During the dance sequence, the camera shifts back and forth between the men's reactions and Strand dancing. All shots on Rand show her pacing back and forth on the stage carrying and dancing with her bubble:

 Kay Kyser, in his "Ol' Perfessor" character, shouts out "Students!" to which a group of men wolf-whistle in unison and exclaim "Baby!": They are William Powell, Spencer Tracy, Ronald Colman, Errol Flynn, Wallace Beery and C. Aubrey Smith.
 Uninterested in Sally's dance, Peter Lorre cryptically states "I haven't seen such a beautiful bubble since I was a child" (possibly in reference to his breakthrough film role as a child murderer in M).
 Henry Fonda hears Alice Aldrich of The Aldrich Family calling "Hen-reeeeee!" to which he quotes "Coming mother!" He is then pulled away by his ear.
 J. Edgar Hoover then says "Gee!" several times as a pun on his position as a G-man.
 Boris Karloff, Arthur Treacher, Buster Keaton, and Mischa Auer watch the dance with their typical deadpan expressions until Ned Sparks, another famous movie "grouch," asks them if they are having a good time. They respond in unison with a solemn "Yes."
 Jerry Colonna is very excited while looking through the binoculars and utters his catchphrases "Guess who?", to which the camera reveals an invisible character next to him called "Yehudi!" ("Who's Yehudi?" was Colonna's famous catchphrase, referring to violinist Yehudi Menuhin).

"Strand" tosses her bubble up in the air and catches it on the way back down, titillating the audience. Now that Strand is standing still on the stage, this allows Harpo Marx, who was hiding underneath a table, the perfect opportunity to shoot her bubble with his slingshot. The bubble explodes when the missile hits it, and Sally reacts with shock as it reveals her wearing a barrel underneath as the curtain closes.

Meanwhile, Gable has finally caught up to the girl he was chasing, insisting she kiss him. "She" turns out to be Groucho Marx in drag and says "Well, fancy meeting you here!" The cartoon ends with a long-lost clip which was cut in reissue prints of Gable saying  to the camera "I'm a bad boy". (This was Lou Costello's catchphrase, Abbott and Costello having become massive comedy stars just the year before.)

Cast
 Kent Rogers as James Cagney, Cary Grant, Edward G. Robinson, Clark Gable, Ned Sparks, Peter Lorre, Groucho Marx, Mickey Rooney, James Stewart, J. Edgar Hoover, Henry Fonda, Bing Crosby, Kay Kyser, Lewis Stone
 Mel Blanc as Jerry Colonna
 Sara Berner as Greta Garbo, Ann Sheridan, Paulette Goddard, Dorothy Lamour, Henry Fonda's Mother

Production notes
 Paulette Goddard is credited as the "Coat Check Girl"

Reception
The Film Daily called the short a "caricature novelty", saying, "Latest Leon Schlesinger foray into the realm of caricature will interest and amuse."

Cartoon voice actor Keith Scott writes, "There have been many twenty-first-century comments about how much this cartoon's cultural references (like conga music) and its raft of celebrities are impenetrable to a contemporary audience. However, on its initial release, Hollywood Steps Out was hyped as a special event and given a publicity buildup in The Los Angeles Times. Audiences in 1941 would have greeted every caricature with instant recognition and hearty laughter."

Home media
Hollywood Steps Out is available on Looney Tunes Golden Collection: Volume 2. It is also available on Looney Tunes Platinum Collection: Volume 2 Disc 2. Both feature the Blue Ribbon reissue title card.

See also
 Looney Tunes and Merrie Melodies filmography (1940–1949)
 Mickey's Gala Premiere
 Mickey's Polo Team
 Mother Goose Goes Hollywood
 The Autograph Hound
 Hollywood Daffy
 Slick Hare
 What's Cookin' Doc?
 What's Up, Doc? (1950 film)
 The Coo-Coo Nut Grove

References

External links

Merrie Melodies short films
1941 animated films
1941 films
Films directed by Tex Avery
1941 comedy films
Films about Hollywood, Los Angeles
1940s American animated films
Animation based on real people
Cultural depictions of actors
Cultural depictions of Greta Garbo
Cultural depictions of Edward G. Robinson
Cultural depictions of Clark Gable
Cultural depictions of Humphrey Bogart
Cultural depictions of James Cagney
Cultural depictions of Johnny Weissmuller
Cultural depictions of Bing Crosby
Cultural depictions of Laurel & Hardy
Cultural depictions of the Marx Brothers
Cultural depictions of Buster Keaton
Cultural depictions of J. Edgar Hoover
Cultural depictions of Peter Lorre
Cultural depictions of The Three Stooges